This is a list of Estonian television related events from 2013.

Events
2 March - Eesti otsib superstaari season 1 winner Birgit Õigemeel is selected to represent Estonia at the 2013 Eurovision Song Contest with her song "Et uus saaks alguse". She is selected to be the nineteenth Estonian Eurovision entry during Eesti Laul held at the Nokia Concert Hall in Tallinn.

Debuts

Television shows

1990s
Õnne 13 (1993–present)

2000s
Eesti otsib superstaari (2007–present)

Ending this year

Births

Deaths

See also
2013 in Estonia